Peace Valley is a small unincorporated community in eastern Howell County, Missouri, United States. It is located approximately two miles east of Route 17 on Route W.

A post office called Peace Valley has been in operation since 1876. The community has the name of Elgin and William Peace, pioneer settlers.

References

Unincorporated communities in Howell County, Missouri
Unincorporated communities in Missouri